Royden Glade Derrick (September 7, 1915 – December 7, 2009) was an American industrialist and general authority of the Church of Jesus Christ of Latter-day Saints (LDS Church) from 1976 until his death.

Derrick was born in Salt Lake City, Utah. He attended LDS Business College for a time and later registered at the University of Utah (U of U) in 1934. However, with his desire to serve as a missionary for the LDS Church, he quit school in the spring of 1936 to work full time in order to prepare for that opportunity. In 1945, he established the Western Steel Company, a steel manufacturing company in Utah that grew to be the largest steel fabricator between the Mississippi River and the west coast, and was later acquired by Joy Manufacturing in 1974. He later served on the U of U's board of trustees and was also awarded an honorary doctorate by the school in 1965. In 1973, he was awarded the Jesse Knight Industrial Citizenship Award from Brigham Young University (BYU).

From 1966 to 1971, Derrick was the second assistant to David Lawrence McKay in the general superintendency of the LDS Church's Sunday School organization. From 1973 to 1976, Derrick was president of the church's England Leeds Mission, and from 1976 to 1977 he was president of the Ireland Dublin Mission.

In 1976, when the church's First Quorum of Seventy was reconstituted, Derrick became one of the original members. From 1980 to 1984, he was one of the seven presidents of the seventy. Derrick served as a general authority until 1989, when he was designated as an emeritus general authority. From 1984 to 1987, while serving as a general authority, Derrick was president of the Seattle Temple.

The planetarium at BYU's College of Physical & Mathematical Sciences is named the Royden G. Derrick Planetarium.

Derrick died at his home in Salt Lake City of causes incident to age.

References

Further reading
 "Elder Royden G. Derrick of the First Quorum of Seventy," Ensign, November 1976, pp. 137–38
Royden G. Derrick, "If Men Never Ventured Beyond Their Experience, the World Would Make No Progress", New Era, April 1979

External links
 Grampa Bill's G.A. Pages: Royden G. Derrick
 Royden G. Derrick Planetarium

1915 births
2009 deaths
Counselors in the General Presidency of the Sunday School (LDS Church)
Members of the First Quorum of the Seventy (LDS Church)
Mission presidents (LDS Church)
Ensign College alumni
American Mormon missionaries in England
American Mormon missionaries in Ireland
People from Salt Lake City
Presidents of the Seventy (LDS Church)
Temple presidents and matrons (LDS Church)
University of Utah alumni
20th-century Mormon missionaries
American general authorities (LDS Church)
Latter Day Saints from Utah
American expatriates in the Republic of Ireland